Graeme Hendry Gordon Spiers (15 January 1925 – 20 June 2007) was a clergyman in the Church of England.

Spiers was educated at the Mercers' School and the London College of Divinity. He was with the Westminster Bank from 1941 to 1949, also serving in the RNVR from 1943 to 1947. He was ordained in  1953. After a curacy in Addiscombe he was Succentor of Bradford Cathedral. He held incumbencies at Speke and Aigburth. He was appointed Archdeacon of Liverpool in 1979 and resigned in 1991.

References

1925 births
2007 deaths
Archdeacons of Liverpool
People educated at Mercers' School
Alumni of the London College of Divinity
Royal Naval Volunteer Reserve personnel of World War II